The history of typography may refer to:
History of Western typography, for the history of typography in Europe and the wider Western world
History of typography in East Asia, for the history of East Asian typography and printing